The Waikato Expressway is a dual carriageway section of  (SH 1) in New Zealand's Waikato region. Constructed in stages, it forms part of the link between Auckland and Hamilton. Currently stretching from Auckland to south of Cambridge, the highway was first built in 1993. Throughout its current lifetime, it had underwent many upgrades to optimize traffic flow throughout the Waikato region, including various bypasses of most towns in the region, and lastly Hamilton in 2022.

The final part of the Expressway was completed on 12 July 2022. Hamilton, as well as several other towns along the current route of SH 1 (such as Huntly, Ngāruawāhia and Cambridge), which have been completely bypassed by the expressway, allowing through traffic to move much more efficiently.

History
While not officially designated as the Waikato Expressway until the early 2000s, the upgrading of SH 1 from the Bombay Hills to Mercer in 1992–93 can be considered the first step in construction of the expressway. In this upgrade, SH 1 from the end of the Southern Motorway to just north of Mercer was upgraded from two lanes to four, with grade-separated interchanges constructed at Bombay and the junction with SH 2 just north of the township of Pōkeno. A bypass of Pōkeno was also constructed at this time, as well as several partially separated interchanges to allow access for local property owners along the route.

The Rangiriri to Ohinewai section was completed in 2003. The northern half of this section follows the pre-existing highway while the southern half of this section deviates from the original highway in order to bypass Ohinewai and features a diamond interchange on Tahuna Rd.

The Mercer to Longswamp section from the Bombay Hills to Mercer was opened in July 2006. The former two-lane section of state highway is now the carriageway for northbound traffic, while a separate carriageway for southbound traffic was constructed in parallel. A grade-separated interchange at Mercer was also constructed, incorporating an overpass for the southbound lanes to cross over the North Island Main Trunk railway (NIMT) at this point.

As the two dual carriageway sections of the expressway (Bombay Hills to Longswamp and Rangiriri to Ohinewai) were not continuous, the section of highway between Longswamp and Rangiriri was upgraded to a 2+1 road in 2005 with the intention of upgrading it to four lanes later.

In 2009 the Waikato Expressway was announced by the Minister of Transport, Steven Joyce, as being one of seven "roads of national significance".

The $210m Mangaharakeke Drive section, originally known as the Te Rapa Bypass, was opened on 3 December 2012 between Horotiu and Rotokauri. Construction of the section of the expressway and Mangaharakeke Drive between Taupiri and Horotiu, bypassing Ngāruawāhia, began in late 2011 and was officially opened on 14 December 2013.

Following funding approval in December 2012 construction of the Rangiriri and Cambridge sections commenced in March and August 2013 respectively. The Cambridge section was opened officially on 15 December 2015 and to traffic the next day. The Rangiriri section mainline opened as a single carriageway on 21 June 2016, and became fully operational as a dual carriageway on 13 April 2017.

Construction of the Huntly section began in late August 2015. Construction of the Hamilton section, the longest stretch, commenced in March 2016. Construction of the Longswamp section, the last section to commence, began in October 2016 and it opened in December 2019.

In May 2017, the NZTA started consulting on a  extension of the expressway, from the current terminus at Cambridge south to the  intersection at Piarere.

The final section, bypassing Hamilton, was opened formally on 12 July 2022 and to traffic on 14 July 2022. On the grand opening day for the final section, a celebration of the completion of the entire expressway project was held. Since 13 July 2022, the speed limit in the section between Hampton Downs and Tamahere has been .

Safety
On the  Cambridge section in the year following its opening, up to 50 serious crashes were avoided because of road safety barriers.

Economic benefits
A 2009 report for New Zealand Transport Agency (NZTA) concluded that the benefit cost ratio of the Expressway was 0.5, i.e. for every dollar of investment the return was 50 cents.

The figures were reworked in 2010 because "Infometrics original RoNS analysis and report was concluded in December 2009. Since this time, NZTA published an updated conventional evaluation of the Waikato Expressway. The materiality of the change to the Waikato Expressway assessment warranted an update and re-run of the CGE model." The re-run model shows benefits of $186.3m pa, against annual costs of $87.3m. However, this is based on a total cost for the road of $1454.4m, which omits land costs, "as from an economy-wide perspective this is merely a transfer of ownership of an existing asset". In June 2015 the NZTA estimated the total cost of the road at between $2,200m and $2,400m. A critic has said that the calculations do not take account of the costs of owning and operating a vehicle on the roads, nor rising fuel costs. In 2016 some MPs were concerned Auckland congestion would cut travel time savings and hence the cost-benefit ratio of 1.4:1. One MP commented that the alternative commuter train, with the same CBR, didn't "get a look in".

The benefits were calculated on what was said to be a conservative estimate of 18,000 vehicles saving 15 minutes per day at a cost of $25/ hour, giving a yearly benefit of around $40 million.

Future extension
In December 2020 the NZTA reported that an evaluation of extending the Waikato Expressway south of Cambridge  to the SH 1/SH 29 intersection at Piarere would be completed in 2021 but that there was as yet no funding for the project. The extension would bypass the existing highway around the shores of Lake Karapiro.

Exit list

|-

Mangaharakeke Drive (Te Rapa spur)

See also
List of motorways and expressways in New Zealand

References

External links
Official website
video of 10 min flyover of Hamilton bypass route in September 2017

Roads in New Zealand
Transport in Waikato
State Highway 1 (New Zealand)